Mark Philippoussis was the defending champion, but lost in the second round to Tommy Haas.

Andre Agassi won the title, defeating Jason Stoltenberg 6–4, 7–6(7–3) in the final.

Seeds

  Mark Philippoussis (second round)
  Álbert Costa (quarterfinals)
  Magnus Norman (first round)
  Nicolas Kiefer (second round)
  Francisco Clavet (first round)
  Albert Portas (first round)
  Julián Alonso (first round)
  Richard Fromberg (second round)

Draw

Finals

Top half

Bottom half

Qualifying

Qualifying seeds
{{columns-list|colwidth=30em|
  Byron Black (second round)
  Juan Albert Viloca (second round)
  Scott Draper (qualifying competition, Lucky loser)  Wayne Black (first round)  Oliver Gross (second round)  Franco Squillari (qualified)
  Sandon Stolle (first round)  Alex O'Brien (first round)}}

Qualifiers

Lucky loser
  Scott Draper

Special exempt
  Sébastien Lareau (reached the semifinals at Philadelphia)''

Qualifying draw

First qualifier

Second qualifier

Third qualifier

Fourth qualifier

References

External links
 Official results archive (ATP)
 Official results archive (ITF)

Singles